Cutanji River is a river in the state of Alagoas in eastern Brazil.

See also
List of rivers of Alagoas

References
Brazilian Ministry of Transport

Rivers of Alagoas